Wan shui qian shan is a 1959 Chinese film directed by Yin Cheng. The literal translation of the title of this movie is: Ten thousand rivers and one thousand mountains.

This movie is a general depiction of the 1930s Long March of the Chinese Red Army.

External links

1959 films
Chinese war films
Chinese propaganda films
Maoist China propaganda films
1950s Mandarin-language films